Robby Unser (born January 12, 1968) is an American former Indy Racing League driver and nine-time winner of the Pikes Peak International Hillclimb. He was the IRL rookie of the year in 1998. Robby made two starts in the Indianapolis 500 with a best finish of 5th in 1998. He also finished second twice in the 1998 season, his best IRL finish. His last IRL start came in 2000, his 21st IRL race. He is the son of Bobby Unser and cousin of Al Unser Jr.

Robby made his drifting debut in the 2007 Formula D season driving for Enjuku Racing. The team had its first win in Denver on June 29, 2007.

2014-2015 Robby is heading the "Team Speedway Racing Team" of Speedway Motors of Lincoln, NE in a 17 event Goodguys AutoCross series.

Racing record

American open–wheel racing results
(key)

CART

Indy Lights

Indy Racing League

Indianapolis 500

References

External links
Formula D profile 

1968 births
American people of Swiss-German descent
American rally drivers
Drifting drivers
Indianapolis 500 drivers
Indy Lights drivers
IndyCar Series drivers
Living people
Racing drivers from Albuquerque, New Mexico
Barber Pro Series drivers
Atlantic Championship drivers
World of Outlaws drivers
Unser family

PacWest Racing drivers
Team Pelfrey drivers
Cheever Racing drivers